Bear Creek Ranch is a planned community and census-designated place (CDP) in Dallas County, Texas, United States. It was first listed as a CDP in the 2020 census with a population of 1,787.

References 

Populated places in Dallas County, Texas
Census-designated places in Dallas County, Texas
Census-designated places in Texas